Initially built as a combined passenger and transport ship for Turkey, Hugo Zeye was taken over by Nazi Germany's Kriegsmarine at the outbreak of the war and completed as a torpedo training ship. Equipped with eight torpedo tubes, the ship was used to train torpedo personnel for surface combat ships in the Baltic Sea.

Fate
In 1945, the ship was used to evacuate military personnel and civilians from East Prussia. On her last evacuation voyage, the ship hit a mine northwest of Fehmarn early on 14 March 1945 and sank in position . All but 5 people on board could be saved.

References 
Notes

Bibliography

1939 ships
Training ships of the Kriegsmarine
World War II auxiliary ships of Germany
Ships sunk by mines
World War II shipwrecks in the Baltic Sea
Ships built in Rostock
Maritime incidents in March 1945